Bipolaris cookei is a plant pathogen that affects sorghum, infecting leaf veins and lesions and causing target leaf spot. It is found in the United States, Sudan, Israel, Cyprus, South America, and India.

References

External links 
 Index Fungorum
 USDA ARS Fungal Database

Fungi of North America
Fungi of South America
Fungi of Asia
Fungi of Africa
Fungal plant pathogens and diseases
Sorghum diseases
Pleosporaceae